Carl Friedrich Gauss (1777–1855) is the eponym of all of the topics listed below. 
There are over 100 topics all named after this German mathematician and scientist, all in the fields of mathematics, physics, and astronomy. The English eponymous adjective Gaussian is pronounced  .

Mathematics

Algebra and linear algebra

Geometry and differential geometry

Number theory

Cyclotomic fields 
Gaussian period
Gaussian rational
Gauss sum, an exponential sum over Dirichlet characters
Elliptic Gauss sum, an analog of a Gauss sum
Quadratic Gauss sum

Analysis, numerical analysis, vector calculus and calculus of variations

Complex analysis and convex analysis 
Gauss–Lucas theorem 
Gauss's continued fraction, an analytic continued fraction derived from the hypergeometric functions
Gauss's criterion – described on Encyclopedia of Mathematics
Gauss's hypergeometric theorem, an identity on hypergeometric series
Gauss plane

Statistics 

Gauss–Kuzmin distribution, a discrete probability distribution
Gauss–Markov process
Gauss–Markov theorem
Gaussian copula
Gaussian measure 
Gaussian correlation inequality
Gaussian isoperimetric inequality
 Gauss's inequality

Gaussian function and topics named for it

Knot theory 

Gauss code	– described on  website of University of Toronto
Gauss linking integral (knot theory)

Other mathematical areas 

 Gauss's algorithm for determination of the day of the week
 Gauss's Easter algorithm
Gaussian brackets – described on WolframMathWorld
Gaussian's modular arithmetic 
Gaussian integer, usually written as 
Gaussian prime
 Gaussian logarithms (also known as addition and subtraction logarithms)

Cartography 

Gauss–Krüger coordinate system 
Gaussian grid

Physics 
Gaussian optics

Classical mechanics 
Gauss's principle of least constraint
For orbit determination in orbital mechanics:
Gauss's law for gravity
Gaussian gravitational constant
Gaussian year

Quantum mechanics 
Gaussian orbital

Electromagnetism 

gauss, the CGS unit for magnetic field
Degaussing, to demagnetize an object
Gauss rifle or coilgun
Gauss's law for magnetism
Gaussian surface
Gauss's law, giving the relationship between flux through a closed surface and the enclosed source

Awards and recognitions 
Carl Friedrich Gauss Prize, a mathematics award
Gauss Lectureship, a mathematical distinction
 The Gauss Mathematics Competition in Canadian junior high schools, an annual national mathematics competition administered by the Centre for Education in Mathematics and Computing

Place names and expedition named in his honour

Institutions named in his honour 
 The Carl-Friedrich-Gauss School for Mathematics, Computer Science, Business Administration, Economics, and Social Sciences of Braunschweig University of Technology
 The Carl-Friedrich-Gauss Gymnasium (a school for grades 5–13) in Worms, Germany

Other things named for him 

 Gaussia, a palm genus described by Hermann Wendland with the then new species Gaussia princeps, collected by Charles Wright in western Cuba. Named in “memoriam astronomi Caroli Friderici Gauss”.
 Gaussia, a genus of copepods
Gaussian, a computational chemistry software program
GAUSS, a matrix programming language for mathematics and statistics

References

Gauss
List of things